Pasiphila coelica is a moth in the family Geometridae. It is endemic to Borneo.

The forewings are variegated with dark brown, green to almost whitish.

References

External links

Moths described in 1932
Endemic fauna of Borneo
coelica